WMCB-LP (107.9 FM) is a radio station licensed to serve Greenfield, Massachusetts.  The station is owned by Greenfield Community Television, Inc. It airs a community radio format. The station first aired in May 2008.

WMCB-LP previously shared the 107.9 MHz frequency with religious broadcaster WLPV-LP (now at 97.3), with WMCB-LP broadcasting from noon to midnight and WLPV-LP broadcasting from midnight to noon. This ended in the winter of 2020, when WLPV-LP moved to its own frequency and began full 24-hour operations.

The station was assigned the WMCB-LP call letters by the Federal Communications Commission on July 7, 2006.

See also
List of community radio stations in the United States

References

External links
WMCB-LP official website
 

MCB-LP
Community radio stations in the United States
MCB-LP
Mass media in Franklin County, Massachusetts
Greenfield, Massachusetts
Radio stations established in 2008
2008 establishments in Massachusetts